Vice Admiral Sir Anthony Knox Dymock KBE, CB, FRSA (born 18 July 1949) is a senior British Royal Navy officer.

Naval career
Educated at Brighton Hove and Sussex Grammar School, University of East Anglia where he graduated in Russian and Philosophy, and the Royal Naval College Dartmouth, Dymock joined the Royal Navy in 1971. After serving in the Falklands War and being promoted to Commander in 1985, he became Commanding Officer of HMS Plymouth in 1985, Deputy Commander of the UK Task Group during the Gulf War and Commanding Officer of HMS Cambeltown in 1992. He went on to be Commanding Officer of HMS Cornwall as well as Captain of the 2nd Frigate Squadron in 1996, Deputy Commander of Strike Force South at NATO in 2000 and Head of the British Defence Staff and Defence Attaché in Washington, D.C. in 2002. His last appointment was as UK Military Representative to NATO from 2006 until he retired in 2008.

He is an alumnus of Harvard's Kennedy School Senior Executive Security Program, and has lectured on security at the National Defense University and the Massachusetts Institute of Technology. He became a Fellow of the Royal Society of Arts in 2005. He is also a Member of the Nautical Institute and a Freeman of the City of London.

References

|-

1949 births
Living people
Alumni of the University of East Anglia
Harvard Kennedy School alumni
Royal Navy vice admirals
British naval attachés
Companions of the Order of the Bath
Knights Commander of the Order of the British Empire
Military personnel from Liverpool